Brian Pendleton (13 April 1944 – 16 May 2001) was a British guitarist, and a founder member of the 1960s pop group Pretty Things.

Early life
Born in Wolverhampton, England, Pendleton moved south as a child, attending Dartford Grammar School. After school, he started work in the same field as his father as a trainee insurance clerk, before responding to an advertisement placed in Melody Maker by Dick Taylor and Phil May of the Pretty Things, seeking a guitarist.

Musical career
As rhythm guitarist for Pretty Things, Pendleton featured on their first two albums, The Pretty Things and Get the Picture?, and the period of the band's greatest commercial success, when they enjoyed hits such as "Rosalyn" and "Don't Bring Me Down" (1964) and "Honey I Need" (1965). Brian played the memorable slide guitar on "Rosalyn", and the Pretty Things sound of the period owes a great deal to his driving rhythm guitar playing. In December 1966, exhausted by life on the road, Pendleton quit the band suddenly while en route to a concert in Leeds, and left the music industry.

Later life and death
Pendleton became an insurance underwriter and followed this career for over 20 years, working for Sun Alliance Insurance and later the Prudential. On 25 May 2001 he was found dead by the door of his flat in Maidstone, Kent; he had been suffering from lung cancer. He was survived by two sons.

References

External links 
A Tribute to Brian Pendleton Website

English rock guitarists
English male guitarists
1944 births
2001 deaths
Musicians from Wolverhampton
People educated at Dartford Grammar School
Deaths from lung cancer in England
Pretty Things members
20th-century British guitarists
20th-century British male musicians
20th-century British musicians